Brian Peter Watts (born March 18, 1966) is an American professional golfer.

Early life and amateur career
Watts was born in Montreal, Quebec, Canada to European parents, but is now a U.S. citizen who lives in Texas. He played college golf at Oklahoma State and won the NCAA Division I Championship in 1987 and was a member of the team that won the 1987 NCAA Division I Team Championship. He also won the 1986 Big 8 Conference Championship and the 1985 and 1987 Morris Williams Intercollegiate (tied Ben Crenshaw's scoring record in '85) as part of his 7 collegiate wins. Only Lindy Miller, Scott Verplank and Willie Wood have more college wins in OSU's long successful golf history. Watts was a four-time All-American (two-time first team and two-time second team) and a 1987 runner-up for the Fred Haskins award. Only Watts and Tom Jones are credited for never shooting a score in the 80s while at OSU. Watts won the 1984 Texas State 5A High School Championship and added the prestigious A.J.G.A. Player of the Year honors later that year. After being honored as the 1984 AJGA Player of the Year, Watts won the AJGA Polo Golf Junior Classic the same week. Watts partnered with John Daly to win the 1984 AJGA Future Legends of Golf as well. In 1983, Watts added two more AJGA championships to his record by winning the AJGA Oklahoma Junior Classic & AJGA Holiday Junior Classic. As a 15 year old, once shot a 59 (−13) at his home course Brookhaven C.C. Presidents Course.

Professional career
Watts turned professional in 1988. During the 1990s, he played mainly on the Japan Golf Tour, having gained his card via the Asia Golf Circuit, where he topped the Order of Merit in 1993. During his six seasons on the Japan Golf Tour from 1993 to 1998 he had 12 tournament victories and 12 runner-up finishes, amassing 63 top-10s in 124 events. When he left the tour he was the second all-time foreign money leader (593 million yen) to David Ishii. Only foreign players to have won more events were Ishii and Graham Marsh when Watts left for the PGA Tour in late 1998. His biggest victories in Japan were the 1994 Bridgestone Open where he defeated then World Number 1 Nick Price on the final day and the 1998 Casio World Open where then World Number 1 Tiger Woods was making his Japan Golf Tour debut. His first professional win was at the 1993 Hong Kong Open. However, he is best known for his performance at The Open Championship at Royal Birkdale in 1998, where he lost in the playoff to Mark O'Meara. He had a two stroke lead entering the final round and shot 70. On the 72nd hole Watts faced a bunker shot where his right leg was out of the bunker and he nearly holed it from 45 feet. After making the 1 foot par putt on the final hole Watts failed to make two short birdie putts on the first two playoff holes and ended up losing by two shots in the four hole playoff. This performance helped earn Watts a PGA Tour card and by the end of the year he reached the top 20 of the Official World Golf Ranking.

In a successful 1999 season on the PGA Tour he finished 57th on the money list, including 26th in scoring average. He was one of a handful of players to make the cut in all four major championships and the Players Championship but his career was ended soon afterwards due to injuries.

Following a number of poor seasons, Watts has played little competitive golf since 2005 while rehabilitating from hip, knee, foot, and back injuries.

Amateur wins
this list may be incomplete
1986 Trans-Mississippi Amateur, LaJet National Amateur 
1987 NCAA Division I Championship

Professional wins (13)

Japan Golf Tour wins (12)

*Note: The 1998 Yomiuri Open was shortened to 36 holes due to rain.

Japan Golf Tour playoff record (3–2)

Asia Golf Circuit wins (1)

Playoff record
PGA Tour playoff record (0–1)

Results in major championships

CUT = missed the half-way cut
"T" = tied

Summary

Most consecutive cuts made – 6 (1998 Open Championship – 1999 PGA)
Longest streak of top-10s – 1

Results in The Players Championship

CUT = missed the halfway cut
"T" indicates a tie for a place

Results in World Golf Championships

QF, R16, R32, R64 = Round in which player lost in match play
"T" = Tied

See also
1990 PGA Tour Qualifying School graduates
2002 PGA Tour Qualifying School graduates
List of golfers with most Japan Golf Tour wins

References

External links

Canadian male golfers
American male golfers
Oklahoma State Cowboys golfers
PGA Tour golfers
Japan Golf Tour golfers
Golfing people from Quebec
Golfers from Oklahoma
Sportspeople from Montreal
Golfers from Dallas
1966 births
Living people